Municipal elections were held in the Czech Republic on 15 and 16 October. The Civic Democratic Party won the most seats, although it lost in Prague. The elections were a success for the Czech Social Democratic Party and TOP 09, and were considered a revival for the Christian and Democratic Union – Czechoslovak People's Party.

Results

References

2010
Municipal elections
Municipal elections
Czech municipal elections